Thomas Accipe Issorat (born 3 September 1993) is a French Guianaan footballer who currently plays for CSC de Cayenne in the French Guiana Régional 1 and the French Guiana national team.

International career 
Issorat made his national team debut for French Guiana on 23 June 2017 in a 1–1 draw against Jamaica.

Issorat scored his first goal and first competitive goal on 7 September 2018, scoring the opening goal in a 5–0 win against Anguilla, as part of 2019–20 CONCACAF Nations League qualifying.

International goals 
Scores and results list French Guiana's goal tally first.

References

External links 
 

1993 births
Living people
Sportspeople from Cayenne
Association football forwards
French Guianan footballers
French Guiana international footballers
Expatriate footballers in Belgium
Belgian Third Division players
French expatriate footballers
French expatriate sportspeople in Belgium